Enrique Mateos Mancebo (15 July 1934 – 6 July 2001) was a Spanish footballer who played as a striker.

He amassed La Liga totals of 123 games and 48 goals over the course of 13 seasons, representing in the competition Real Madrid, Sevilla and Betis.

Club career
Born in Madrid, Mateos finished his graduation at local and national powerhouse Real Madrid. He was mainly a reserve player during his eight-year spell with the first team, which won 13 major titles during that timeframe; his best output came during the 1956–57 season, when he scored a career-best 14 goals in 21 games en route to the La Liga championship; additionally, he netted nine times in 16 appearances combined in the European Cup, winning the tournament on four occasions.

Mateos left the Merengues in the 1961 summer, with official totals of 93 matches and 50 goals. He subsequently represented, in his country, Sevilla FC, Recreativo de Huelva, Real Betis (two spells with both clubs) and Gimnástica de Torrelavega, suffering a serious injury whilst at the service of the first from which he never fully recovered; until his retirement at the age of 37, he also played for the Cleveland Stokers in the North American Soccer League and East London Celtic in South Africa.

Subsequently, Mateos worked as a manager for roughly twenty years. His biggest achievement at the professional level consisted of leading Cádiz CF to its first-ever promotion to the top flight in 1977, being sacked early into the following campaign as the Andalusians were eventually relegated back.

International career
Mateos earned eight caps for the Spain football team, during four years. He scored in his debut on 31 March 1957, a 5–0 friendly win in Belgium.

Career statistics

Death
Mateos died in Seville on 6 July 2001, two weeks shy of his 67th birthday.

Honours
Real Madrid
La Liga: 1953–54, 1954–55, 1956–57, 1957–58, 1960–61
European Cup: 1955–56, 1956–57, 1957–58, 1958–59, 1959–60
Intercontinental Cup: 1960
Latin Cup: 1955, 1957

References

External links

1934 births
2001 deaths
Footballers from Madrid
Spanish footballers
Association football forwards
La Liga players
Segunda División players
Real Madrid Castilla footballers
Real Madrid CF players
Sevilla FC players
Recreativo de Huelva players
Real Betis players
Gimnástica de Torrelavega footballers
North American Soccer League (1968–1984) players
Cleveland Stokers players
Spain B international footballers
Spain international footballers
Spanish expatriate footballers
Expatriate soccer players in the United States
Expatriate soccer players in South Africa
Spanish expatriate sportspeople in the United States
Spanish football managers
La Liga managers
Segunda División managers
Cádiz CF managers
Deportivo de La Coruña managers
CD Fuengirola managers
UEFA Champions League winning players